Hyposmocoma lugens is a species of moth of the family Cosmopterigidae. Lord Walsingham first described it in 1907. It is endemic to the Hawaiian island of Maui.

External links

lugens
Endemic moths of Hawaii
Moths described in 1907
Taxa named by Thomas de Grey, 6th Baron Walsingham